Leptospirillum ferriphilum is an iron-oxidising bacterium. It is one of the species responsible for the generation of acid mine drainage. It is of particular relevance in South African commercial biooxidation tanks operating at 40 °C.

References

Further reading

External links

Type strain of Leptospirillum ferriphilum at BacDive -  the Bacterial Diversity Metadatabase

Nitrospirota
Bacteria described in 2002